William Grant Glassco,  (August 30, 1935 – September 13, 2004) was a Canadian theatre director, producer, translator and founder of Toronto's Tarragon Theatre.

Born in Quebec City, Quebec, he studied at the University of Toronto, Princeton University and Oxford University. From 1959 to 1964, Glassco taught English at the University of Toronto. He lived in New York City from 1967 to 1969, where he studied acting and directing at New York University. Glassco returned to Canada in 1969. He founded the Tarragon Theatre in 1970 with his wife Jane (née Gordon), and stayed there until 1982. Later, he became the artistic director of the CentreStage Theatre Company which merged, in 1988, with the Toronto Free Theatre to become CanStage. He is also known for introducing the English-speaking world (along with co-translator John Van Burek) to the plays of Quebec playwright Michel Tremblay, including Les Belles-sœurs and Albertine in Five Times.

In 1982, he was made an Officer of the Order of Canada.

In 2002, he was awarded the Silver Ticket Lifetime Achievement Dora Award.

References

External links
 Order of Canada Citation
 William Grant Glassco at The Canadian Encyclopedia

1935 births
2004 deaths
Canadian theatre directors
Officers of the Order of Canada
University of Toronto alumni
Academic staff of the University of Toronto
Canadian literary critics
People from Quebec City
Academics in Quebec
Anglophone Quebec people
20th-century Canadian translators
Canadian artistic directors